Black cross or Black Cross may refer to:
 Black Cross (Teutonic Order), heraldic insignia of the Teutonic order (since 1205)
 Black Cross (Germany), military emblem of Prussia and Germany, derived from the cross used by the Teutonic order
 Anarchist Black Cross, an anarchist support organization
 Black Cross Navigation and Trading Company, the successor of the Black Star Line
 "Black Cross (Hezekiah Jones)", a 1948 poem by Joseph Simon Newman, recorded by Lord Buckley and by Bob Dylan
 Black Cross, also known as Knights of the Teutonic Order, a 1960 film from Poland
 "Black Cross" (song), debut single of the band 45 Grave
 Kroaz Du, a Breton flag

See also

 Blue Cross (disambiguation)
 Bronze Cross
 Green Cross
 Red Cross (disambiguation)
 Silver Cross
 White Cross (disambiguation)
 Yellow cross

Cross, black
Cross symbols